John Sloss Hobart (May 6, 1738 – February 4, 1805) was a United States senator from New York and a United States district judge of the United States District Court for the District of New York.

Education and career

Born on May 6, 1738, in Fairfield, Fairfield County, Connecticut Colony, British America, Hobart graduated from Yale University in 1757. He studied law, was admitted to the bar and commenced practice in New York. He was a member of the Committee of Correspondence in 1774. He was a deputy to the Provincial Convention in 1775. He was a deputy to the Provincial Congress of New York from 1775 to 1777. He was a member of the Council of Safety in 1777. He was an associate justice of the Supreme Court of Judicature of New York from 1777 to 1798. He was a member of the Hartford Convention of 1780. He was a member of the New York convention which ratified the United States Constitution in 1788.

Congressional service

Hobart was elected to the United States Senate from New York as a Federalist in 1798 to fill the vacancy caused by the resignation of United States Senator Philip Schuyler and served from January 11 to April 16, 1798, when he resigned to accept a federal judicial post.

Federal judicial service

Hobart was nominated by President John Adams on April 11, 1798, to a seat on the United States District Court for the District of New York vacated by Judge Robert Troup. He was confirmed by the United States Senate on April 12, 1798, and received his commission the same day. His service terminated on February 4, 1805, due to his death in New York City, New York. He was interred in Trinity Church Cemetery in New York City.

References

Sources

 

1738 births
1805 deaths
Yale College alumni
Judges of the United States District Court for the District of New York
United States senators from New York (state)
New York (state) Federalists
United States federal judges appointed by John Adams
18th-century American judges
Federalist Party United States senators
Lawyers from Fairfield, Connecticut
People from Fairfield, Connecticut
People of the Province of New York
Burials at Trinity Church Cemetery